The GM Alpha platform currently underpins General Motors' compact to mid-size, front-engine, rear-wheel and four-wheel drive vehicles.  Platform basics include MacPherson struts on the front, 5 link independent rear, use of high strength steel and aluminum, and an overall focus on reducing weight. The GM Alpha platform made its debut in the 2013 Cadillac ATS, which entered production in July 2012.

History
Prior to the August 2012 debut of the compact Cadillac ATS, the first vehicle produced on the GM Alpha platform, Cadillac's smallest vehicle was the mid-size CTS. The CTS was priced the same as compact competitors like the Audi A4, the BMW 3 Series and the Mercedes-Benz C-Class but was noticeably larger and heavier, comparable in size and weight to the mid-size BMW 5 Series. Although Cadillac believed that customers would favor a 5 Series-sized car at a 3 Series price, that assumption proved to be incorrect. Cadillac's research found that target customers who already owned vehicles like the 3 Series or A4 didn't want a larger vehicle. General Motors chose to use an updated and lightened version of the GM Zeta platform developed in 2004 by Holden Motors in Australia. ; that car would eventually become the ATS.

Development rationale
During the early development of the Cadillac ATS, General Motors engineers determined that downsizing the GM Sigma II platform that underpinned the second-generation CTS would result in a vehicle that was too heavy and that using an economical, front-wheel drive platform would sacrifice performance. Under the leadership of Dave Leone, General Motors engineers created a brand-new platform which was designed to be light and compact, capable of handling both rear- and all-wheel drive configurations and having a near 50/50 weight distribution. The new platform developed by the General Motors engineers for the ATS is now called the GM Alpha platform.

Production start
General Motors began assembling Cadillac ATS sedans intended for sale to customers on 26 July 2012.

General Motors began assembling third generation Cadillac CTS sedans intended for sale to customers on 16 September 2013.

Vehicles on sale
 2013-2019 Cadillac ATS
 2014-2019 Cadillac CTS
 2016-present Chevrolet Camaro
 2020-present Cadillac CT4
 2020-present Cadillac CT5

References

Alpha